Seán Kenny may refer to:

 Seán Kenny (politician) (born 1942), Irish Labour Party politician
 Seán Kenny (hurler) (born 1923), Irish hurler for Tipperary
 Sean Kenny (theatre designer) (1929–1973), Irish theatre and film designer
 Sean Kenny (rugby league), English rugby player

See also
 Sean Kenney (disambiguation)